T44 may refer to:
 T-44 tank, a World War II Soviet Union tank
 SJ T44, a Swedish locomotive
 T44 (classification), a classification for disability athletics
 T44 RNA
 the prototype designation for the M14 rifle